"The Prayer" is a song performed by Canadian singer Celine Dion and Italian tenor Andrea Bocelli. It was written by David Foster, Carole Bayer Sager, Alberto Testa and Tony Renis.

"The Prayer" was originally recorded in two solo versions for the 1998 film Quest for Camelot, in English by Dion and in Italian by Bocelli. A duet between Dion and Bocelli later appeared on their respective studio albums, These Are Special Times (1998) and Sogno (1999), and was released as a promotional single on 1 March 1999. "The Prayer" won a Golden Globe Award for Best Original Song and was nominated for an Academy Award for Best Original Song in 1999 and a Grammy Award for Best Pop Collaboration with Vocals in 2000. It received highly positive reviews from music critics and entered adult contemporary charts in Canada and the United States in 1999.

In 2008, Dion released a live version of "The Prayer" as a duet with Josh Groban. This music download entered the Canadian Hot 100 at number 37 and the Billboard Hot 100 at number 70.

History
Originally "The Prayer" was recorded as two separate solo versions, Dion's in English and Bocelli's in Italian. They appeared on the Quest for Camelot soundtrack in May 1998. The duet was included on albums by both artists, released a few months later on Sogno and These Are Special Times. Bocelli sang original Italian while Dion translated into English. The song won the Golden Globe Award for Best Original Song from the 1998 film Quest for Camelot, the second win in a row for a Celine Dion song.  In that film, Dion sang it as a solo with slightly different lyrics. It was also nominated for an Academy Award for Best Original Song in 1999 and a Grammy Award for Best Pop Collaboration with Vocals in 2000. Dion performed it with Bocelli at both ceremonies.

It was also featured on Dion's compilation The Collector's Series, Volume One (2000) and greatest hits My Love: Ultimate Essential Collection (2008). A re-recorded solo version by Celine Dion (renamed "A Mother's Prayer") appeared on her 2004 album Miracle. Dion performed "The Prayer" live during her Taking Chances Tour as a virtual duet with Bocelli on the screen; the performance was released in the Taking Chances World Tour: The Concert CD/DVD. The song appeared also on Bocelli's 2007 compilation The Best of Andrea Bocelli: Vivere.  Dion joined Bocelli to perform the song in his Concerto: One Night in Central Park concert in 2011; the performance was subsequently released on CD and DVD.  Both Dion and Bocelli have sung the song with other duet partners, and various other artists have recorded the song, either as a duet or a solo.

The original version of "The Prayer" failed to chart on the US Billboard Hot 100, but reached number 6 and number 22 on the adult contemporary charts in Canada and the United States, respectively. It has also become popular during Christmas, weddings and, in some cases, funerals and religious services.

Critical reception
Paul Verna from Billboard called this song a "gorgeous duet". Chuck Taylor from Billboard reviewed "The Prayer", calling it "a breathtaking, ultra-lush song, and the tour de force combination of Dion and Bocelli [which] will send a half-dozen chills up your spine". Although he felt that the song is "an unorthodox track for the radio," Taylor called it "affecting," "heartwarming," "absolutely exquisite" and "one of Dion's most radiant performances ever."

Track listing
US promotional CD single
"The Prayer" (Celine Dion and Andrea Bocelli) – 4:29
"The Prayer" (Celine Dion) – 2:48
"The Prayer" (Andrea Bocelli) – 4:10

Personnel
Celine Dion and Andrea Bocelli – vocals
David Foster – arranger, composer, keyboards, piano, producer
William Ross – arranger, orchestral arrangements
Humberto Gatica – engineer, mixing
Felipe Elgueta – engineer, programming

Charts

Weekly charts

Year-end charts

Celine Dion and Josh Groban version

Celine Dion first performed "The Prayer" live with Josh Groban in 1999, when then 17-year old Groban filled in for Andrea Bocelli at rehearsal for the 41st Annual Grammy Awards. Nine years later, the two performed the song during her CBS TV special That's Just the Woman in Me, aired on 15 February 2008. This version was released as a music download in the United States and Canada two days earlier. It proved to be much more successful than the original, entering the Billboard Hot 100 at number 70, becoming Groban's highest-charting song to date as an individual act (he and Dion would both go on to reach number two as members of Artists for Haiti with the song "We Are the World 25 for Haiti" in 2010). It also appeared on a few other Billboard charts: Pop 100 at number 50, Hot Digital Songs at number 32 and Hot Digital Tracks at number 29. The single sold 37,531 copies in its first week in the US. In Canada, the song peaked at number 37 on the Canadian Hot 100 and number 19 on the Canadian Top Digital Downloads.

Charts

Anthony Callea version

Callea first performed this song during Australian Idol 2004, in the week of "contestants choice". He received a standing ovation for this performance and the "Grand Royal Touchdown" from judge Mark Holden. He would go on to be runner-up in this series.

At the completion of the show, Callea was signed to Sony BMG, and he released "The Prayer" as his debut single.

It was released in Australia on 19 December 2004 and debuted at number 1 on the ARIA Charts. It stayed there for five weeks and was certified 4× platinum by ARIA. It became the fastest-selling single by any Australian artist, and was the second-highest-selling single in Australia within the 2000s overall, and for an Australian artist.  The song was included on Callea's debut album Anthony Callea. The music video includes excerpts of Callea recording the song and was released in 2004.

Callea has performed "The Prayer" at numerous concerts as well as the Carols by Candlelight in Melbourne. In 2006, he performed the song in front of Queen Elizabeth II at a Commonwealth Day Service. He also performed it as a duet with Tina Arena on her Symphony of Life CD/DVD, released in 2012.

Track listing
Australian CD single
"The Prayer" – 4:16
"The Prayer" (Sterling Remix) – 4:03

Charts

Weekly charts

Year-end charts

Decade-end charts

Certifications

References

External links

1998 songs
1999 singles
2008 singles
1990s ballads
Andrea Bocelli songs
ARIA Award-winning songs
Best Original Song Golden Globe winning songs
Celine Dion songs
2004 debut singles
Anthony Callea songs
Josh Groban songs
Number-one singles in Australia
Pop ballads
Songs written for animated films
Song recordings produced by David Foster
Songs with lyrics by Alberto Testa (lyricist)
Songs with music by Tony Renis
Songs written by Carole Bayer Sager
Songs written by David Foster
Songs written for films
Male–female vocal duets
Columbia Records singles
Epic Records singles
Sony BMG singles